The Angkatan Perpaduan Ummah (APU or Muslims Unity Movement) was an informal Malaysian political coalition. The now defunct political coalition was formed by Tengku Razaleigh Hamzah's formation of Parti Melayu Semangat 46 (S46 or Semangat 46) after leaving United Malays National Organisation (UMNO) that was declared illegal. jointly with Pan-Malaysian Islamic Party (PAS), Pan-Malaysian Islamic Front (BERJASA), Muslim People's Party of Malaysia (HAMIM) and Malaysian Indian Muslim Congress (KIMMA) before 9th Malaysian General Election in 1990. KIMMA left the coalition before the 10th Malaysian General Election. 

APU along with the Gagasan Rakyat opposition coalitions led by Tengku Razaleigh Hamzah after failures in the 1990 and 1995 general elections, were subsequently formally disbanded in 1996 after Razaleigh decided to dissolve Semangat 46 to return and rejoin back UMNO.

Component parties
 Spirit of 46 Malay Party (Parti Melayu Semangat 46, S46)
 Pan-Malaysian Islamic Front (Barisan Jemaah Islamiah Se-Malaysia, BERJASA)
 Muslim People's Party of Malaysia (Parti Hizbul Muslimin Malaysia, HAMIM)
 Malaysian Indian Muslim Congress (Kongres India Muslim Malaysia, KIMMA)

Elected representatives
 Members of the Dewan Rakyat, 8th Malaysian Parliament
 Malaysian State Assembly Representatives (1990–95)
 Members of the Dewan Rakyat, 9th Malaysian Parliament
 Malaysian State Assembly Representatives (1995–99)

General election results

State election results

References

Defunct political party alliances in Malaysia
1990 establishments in Malaysia
Political parties established in 1990
1996 disestablishments in Malaysia
Political parties disestablished in 1996